Lists of heads of government